Cañas is a canton in the Guanacaste province of Costa Rica. The head city is in Cañas district.

History 
Cañas was created on 12 July 1878 by decree 22.

Geography 
Cañas has an area of  km² and a mean elevation of  metres.
The elongated canton touches the Tempisque River in the southwest. It keeps the Bebedero River and Tenorio River on its western boundary as it widens to encompass agricultural lowlands before climbing into the Cordillera de Guanacaste up to the Tenorio Volcano.

Districts 
The canton of Cañas is subdivided into the following districts:
 Cañas
 Palmira
 San Miguel
 Bebedero
 Porozal

Demographics 

For the 2011 census, Cañas had a population of  inhabitants.

Transportation

Road transportation 
The canton is covered by the following road routes:

References 

Cantons of Guanacaste Province
Populated places in Guanacaste Province